Dark Brown is an early Australian television film, broadcast during 1957 on ABC.

It was broadcast live in Melbourne, one of the first TV productions from that city.

The play was later filmed again by the ABC in Brisbane in 1963.

Plot
In London in 1900, a young woman fears that her husband is going to murder her. She is encouraged in this belief by her mother.  But all is not as it appears to be.

One listing called it "a psychological drama with a suspense twist".

Cast
Walter Brown
Agnes Dobson
Laura James
Roma Johnston
Max Meldrum
Margaret Cruikshank
Lorna Forbes

Production
It was kinescoped (and was repeated several months after the original telecast), and was shown in Sydney (these were the only two cities in Australia with television at the time). Its cast included Walter Brown, Agnes Dobson and British actress Laura James.

Original telecast was on 24 June 1957, repeat telecast via kinescope recording on 30 September 1957.

Repeat
The show was repeated in Melbourne on 30 September 1957.

See also
List of live television plays broadcast on Australian Broadcasting Corporation (1950s)

References

External links
Dark Brown on IMDb
Dark Brown at AustLit

1957 television plays
1950s Australian television plays
Australian Broadcasting Corporation original programming
English-language television shows
Black-and-white Australian television shows
Australian live television shows
Films directed by Christopher Muir